Roger Ballard  (20 April 1943 – 30 September 2020) was a British sociologist, Lecturer in Race Relations at the University of Leeds (1975–1989), and Senior Lecturer in Comparative Religion at the University of Manchester (1989–2003). In Manchester, he taught Urdu language and set up the joint-degree in Comparative Religion and Social Anthropology. In 2003, at the age of 60, Ballard took early retirement from his teaching post in the University of Manchester to service as a consultant anthropologist and Director of Centre for Applied South Asian Studies (CASAS) in Stalybridge. In 2012, Ballard was awarded the Lucy Mair Medal for Applied Anthropology by the Royal Anthropological Institute.

Publications 
Desh Pardesh: The South Asian Presence in Britain (C. Hurst & Co, 1990)
Legal Practice and Cultural Diversity (Routledge, 2009)

References

1943 births
2020 deaths
Fellows of the Royal Anthropological Institute of Great Britain and Ireland
Delhi University alumni
Alumni of the University of Cambridge
British anthropologists
British sociologists
British Indologists
British Muslims
People from York